The 1999 Virginia Cavaliers football team represented the University of Virginia in the 1999 NCAA Division I-A football season. The team's head coach was George Welsh. They played their home games at Scott Stadium in Charlottesville, Virginia.

Schedule

Rankings

References

Virginia
Virginia Cavaliers football seasons
Virginia Cavaliers football